Arimaa  is a two-player strategy board game that was designed to be playable with a standard chess set and difficult for computers while still being easy to learn and fun to play for humans. It was invented between 1997 and 2002 by Omar Syed, an Indian-American computer engineer trained in artificial intelligence. Syed was inspired by Garry Kasparov's defeat at the hands of the chess computer Deep Blue to design a new game which could be played with a standard chess set, would be difficult for computers to play well, but would have rules simple enough for his then four-year-old son Aamir to understand. ("Arimaa" is "Aamir" spelled backwards plus an initial "a".)

Beginning in 2004, the Arimaa community held three annual tournaments: a World Championship (humans only), a Computer Championship (computers only), and the Arimaa Challenge (human vs. computer). After eleven years of human dominance, the 2015 challenge was won decisively by the computer (Sharp by David Wu).

Arimaa has won several awards including GAMES Magazine 2011 Best Abstract Strategy Game, Creative Child Magazine 2010 Strategy Game of the Year, and the 2010 Parents' Choice Approved Award.  It has also been the subject of several research papers.

Rules
Arimaa is played on an 8×8 board with four trap squares.  There are six kinds of pieces, ranging from elephant (strongest) to rabbit (weakest). Stronger pieces can push or pull weaker pieces, and stronger pieces freeze weaker pieces.  Pieces can be captured by dislodging them onto a trap square when they have no orthogonally adjacent  pieces.

The two players, Gold and Silver, each control sixteen pieces. These are, in order from strongest to weakest: one elephant, one camel, two horses, two dogs, two cats, and eight rabbits . These may be represented by the king, queen, rooks, bishops, knights, and pawns respectively when one plays using a chess set.

Objective
The main object of the game is to move a rabbit of one's own color onto the home rank of the opponent, which is known as a goal. Thus Gold wins by moving a gold rabbit to the eighth rank, and Silver wins by moving a silver rabbit to the first rank. However, because it is difficult to usher a rabbit to the goal line while the board is full of pieces, an intermediate objective is to capture opposing pieces by pushing or pulling them into the trap squares.

The game can also be won by capturing all of the opponent's rabbits (elimination) or by depriving the opponent of legal moves (immobilization). Compared to goal, these are uncommon.

Setup
The game begins with an empty board. Gold places the sixteen gold pieces in any configuration on the first and second ranks. Silver then places the sixteen silver pieces in any configuration on the seventh and eighth ranks. Diagram 1 shows one possible initial placement.

Movement
After the pieces are placed on the board, the players alternate turns, starting with Gold. A turn consists of making one to four steps. With each step a piece may move into an unoccupied square one space left, right, forward, or backward, except that rabbits may not step backward. The steps of a turn may be made by a single piece or distributed among several pieces in any order.

A turn must make a net change to the position. Thus one cannot, for example, take one step forward and one step back with the same piece, effectively passing the turn and evading zugzwang. Furthermore, one's turn may not create the same position with the same player to move as has been created twice before. This rule is similar to the situational super ko rule in the game of Go, which prevents endless loops, and is in contrast to chess where endless loops are considered draws. The prohibitions on passing and repetition make Arimaa a drawless game.

Pushing and pulling
The second diagram, from the same game as the initial position above, helps illustrate the remaining rules of movement.

A player may use two consecutive steps of a turn to dislodge an opposing piece with a stronger friendly piece which is adjacent in one of the four cardinal directions. For example, a player's dog may dislodge an opposing rabbit or cat, but not a dog, horse, camel, or elephant. The stronger piece may pull or push the adjacent weaker piece. When pulling, the stronger piece steps into an empty square, and the square it came from is occupied by the weaker piece. The silver elephant on d5 could step to d4 (or c5 or e5) and pull the gold horse from d6 to d5. When pushing, the weaker piece is moved to an adjacent empty square, and the square it came from is occupied by the stronger piece. The gold elephant on d3 could push the silver rabbit on d2 to e2 and then occupy d2. Note that the rabbit on d2 can't be pushed to d1, c2, or d3, because those squares are not empty.

Friendly pieces may not be dislodged. Also, a piece may not push and pull simultaneously. For example, the gold elephant on d3 could not simultaneously push the silver rabbit on d2 to e2 and pull the silver rabbit from c3 to d3. An elephant can never be dislodged, since there is nothing stronger.

Freezing
A piece which is adjacent in any cardinal direction to a stronger opposing piece is frozen, unless it is also adjacent to a friendly piece. Frozen pieces may not be moved by the owner, but may be dislodged by the opponent. A frozen piece can freeze another still weaker piece. The silver rabbit on a7 is frozen, but the one on d2 is able to move because it is adjacent to a silver piece. Similarly the gold rabbit on b7 is frozen, but the gold cat on c1 is not. The dogs on a6 and b6 do not freeze each other because they are of equal strength. An elephant cannot be frozen, since there is nothing stronger, but an elephant can be blockaded.

Capturing
A piece which enters a trap square is captured and removed from the game unless there is a friendly piece orthogonally adjacent. Silver could move to capture the gold horse on d6 by pushing it to c6 with the elephant on d5. A piece on a trap square is captured when all  adjacent friendly pieces move away. Thus if the silver rabbit on c4 and the silver horse on c2 move away, voluntarily or by being dislodged, the silver rabbit on c3 will be captured.

Note that a piece may voluntarily step into a trap square, even if it is thereby captured. Also, the second step of a pulling maneuver is completed even if the piece doing the pulling is captured on the first step. For example, Silver could step the silver rabbit from f4 to g4 (so that it will no longer support pieces at f3), and then step the silver horse from f2 to f3, which captures the horse; the horse's move could still pull the gold rabbit from f1 to f2.

Strategy and tactics
For beginning insights into good play, see the Arimaa Wikibook.

Karl Juhnke, twice Arimaa world champion,  has written a book titled Beginning Arimaa which gives an introduction to Arimaa tactics and strategies. Also Jean Daligault, six time Arimaa world champion, wrote Arimaa Strategies and Tactics which is geared towards those who have started playing Arimaa and want to improve their game.

Annual tournaments

World Championship
Each year since 2004 the Arimaa community has held a World Championship tournament. The tournament is played over the Internet and is open to everyone. Past and current world champion title holders are:
 2004 – Frank Heinemann of Germany
 2005 – Karl Juhnke of USA
 2006 – Till Wiechers of Germany
 2007 – Jean Daligault of France
 2008 – Karl Juhnke of USA
 2009 – Jean Daligault of France
 2010 – Jean Daligault of France
 2011 – Jean Daligault of France
 2012 – Hirohumi Takahashi of Japan
 2013 – Jean Daligault of France
 2014 – Jean Daligault of France
 2015 – Mathew Brown of USA
 2016 – Mathew Brown of USA
 2017 – Mathew Brown of USA
 2018 – Matthew Craven of USA
 2019 – Jerome Richmond of Great Britain
 2020 – Mathew Brown of USA
 2021 – Mathew Brown of USA
 2022 – Jerome Richmond of Great Britain

World Computer Championship
Each year from 2004 to 2015 the Arimaa community held a World Computer Championship tournament.  The tournament is played over the Internet and is open to everyone. The current champion is sharp developed by David Wu of the USA.  Past computer world champion title holders are:
 2004 – Bomb developed by David Fotland of USA
 2005 – Bomb developed by David Fotland of USA
 2006 – Bomb developed by David Fotland of USA
 2007 – Bomb developed by David Fotland of USA
 2008 – Bomb developed by David Fotland of USA
 2009 – clueless developed by Jeff Bacher of Canada
 2010 – marwin developed by Mattias Hultgren of Sweden
 2011 – sharp developed by David Wu of USA
 2012 – marwin developed by Mattias Hultgren of Sweden
 2013 – ziltoid developed by Ricardo Barreira of Portugal
 2014 – sharp developed by David Wu of USA
 2015 – sharp developed by David Wu of USA

Arimaa Challenge
The Arimaa Challenge was a cash prize of around $10,000 that was to have been available annually until 2020 for the first computer program to win the human-versus-computer Arimaa challenge.  As part of the conditions of the prize, the computer program must run on standard, off-the-shelf hardware.

The Arimaa Challenge was held twelve times, starting in 2004. Following the second match, Syed changed the format to require the software to win two out of three games against each of three players, to reduce the psychological pressure on individual volunteer defenders. Also Syed called for outside sponsorship of the Arimaa Challenge to build a bigger prize fund.

In the first five challenge cycles, David Fotland, programmer of Many Faces of Go, won the Arimaa Computer Championship and the right to play for the prize money, only to see his program beaten decisively each year. In 2009 Fotland's program was surpassed by several new programs in the same year, the strongest of which was Clueless by Jeff Bacher. Humanity's margin of dominance over computers appeared to widen each year from 2004 to 2008 as the best human players improved, but the 2009 Arimaa Challenge was more competitive. Clueless became the first bot to win two games of a Challenge match.

In 2010, Mattias Hultgren's bot Marwin edged out Clueless in the computer championship. In the Challenge match Marwin became the first bot to win two out of three games against a single human defender, and also the first bot to win three of the nine games overall. In 2011, however, Marwin won only one of the nine games, and that one having received a material handicap. In 2012 a new challenger, Briareus, became the first program to defeat a top-ten player, sweeping all three games from the fifth-ranked human.  In 2013, however, the humans struck back against Marwin, with #4 and #6 each sweeping including a handicap win, and #31 winning two of three games. In 2014, the computer bounced back to win two games, albeit no matches.

In 2015, Sharp made a substantial leap in playing strength. After having scored 6-6 in twelve games against its top two computer rivals the previous year, Sharp went undefeated in the computer tournaments of 2015, including 13-0 against the second- and third-place finishers. Sharp dominated the pre-Challenge screening against human opponents, winning 27 of 29 games. In the Challenge itself, Sharp clinched victory in each of the three mini-matches by winning the first six games, finishing 7-2 overall and winning the Arimaa challenge. Wu published a paper describing the algorithm and most of ICGA Journal Issue 38/1 was dedicated to this topic. The algorithm combined traditional alpha–beta pruning (changing sides every 4 ply) with heuristic functions manually written while analysing human expert games.

After DeepMind's AlphaZero mastered Go, Chess, and Shogi simply by playing itself, Omar Syed announced a $10,000 prize for the creation of such an Arimaa bot which could win a 10-game match against Sharp. This has not yet been done.

Patent and trademark
 was filed on 3 October 2003, and granted on 3 January 2006. Omar Syed also holds a trademark on the name "Arimaa".

Syed has stated that he does not intend to restrict noncommercial use and has released a license called "The Arimaa Public License" with the declared intent to "make Arimaa as much of a public domain game as possible while still protecting its commercial usage". Items covered by the license are the patent and the trademark.

See also

 Computer Arimaa
 Game complexity
 Anti-computer tactics
 Games inspired by chess
 Competitions and prizes in artificial intelligence
 List of world championships in mind sports

Notes

References

Further reading
 Wikibook: Arimaa Strategy
 Daligault, Jean (2012). Arimaa Strategies and Tactics. CreateSpace Independent Publishing Platform.

External links

 Official Arimaa website
 David Fotland's Arimaa program
 The Arimaa Public License

Abstract strategy games
Board games
Games of mental skill
Computer science competitions
Game artificial intelligence